A bronze bust of Edvard Grieg by Finn Frolich is installed in Grieg Garden on the University of Washington campus in Seattle's University District, in the U.S. state of Washington.

See also

 Campus of the University of Washington

References

External links
 'Edvard Grieg Bust - University of Washington at Waymarking

Bronze sculptures in Washington (state)
Busts in Washington (state)
Monuments and memorials in Seattle
Grieg
Outdoor sculptures in Seattle
Sculptures of men in Washington (state)
University of Washington campus